J.L. Johnson Stadium is a baseball venue in Tulsa, Oklahoma, United States.  It is home to the Oral Roberts Golden Eagles baseball team of the NCAA Division I The Summit League.  Dedicated on June 17, 1977, the stadium was opened on March 6, 1978, for a game against Southeastern Oklahoma State University.  Oral Roberts won the game 7–6.  The venue's seated capacity is 2,418 spectators.

Features 
Johnson Stadium's most notable feature is its cantilevered roof, similar to that of San Juan, Puerto Rico's Estadio Hiram Bithorn and Lynn, Massachusetts's Fraser Field.  White, zig-zag patterned paneling forms a roof and facade which cover most of the venue's seating.  This seating is elevated, with the first row of seats starting at the dugout roofs' height.

A thirty-foot batter's eye stands in center field, with an electronic scoreboard in right center.  The stadium's outfield walls were replaced during 2009 renovations.

The venue also features stadium lighting, dugouts, a mesh backstop, a press box, locker rooms, and practice facilities.  In 2006, the Golden Eagle Sports Complex, which includes workout space, an indoor practice facility, baseball offices, and the Grand Slam Room (from which program boosters can watch games), was added.  The complex cost $1.6 million on the project.

Tournaments hosted 
J.L. Johnson has hosted many postseason tournaments, the dates of which are listed below.

NCAA Midwest Regional: 1978, 1980, 1981
Midwestern Collegiate Conference Tournament: 1981, 1983, 1985
Mid-Continent Conference Tournament: 1998, 1999, 2000, 2001, 2002, 2003, 2005, 2006
Summit League Tournament: 2008, 2009, 2010, 2012, 2016, 2017, 2018, 2019, 2022

See also 
 List of NCAA Division I baseball venues

References

External links 
J.L. Johnson Stadium Photo Gallery at digitalballparks.com
J.L. Johnson Stadium Photo Gallery at orugoldeneagles.com

College baseball venues in the United States
Baseball venues in Oklahoma
Oral Roberts Golden Eagles baseball
Sports venues completed in 1978
1978 establishments in Oklahoma